Bid Boland (also Romanized as Bīd Boland; also known as Beed Bolin) is a small village in Tashan-e Gharbi Rural District, Tashan District, Behbahan County, Khuzestan Province, Iran. At the 2006 census, its population was 517, in 96 families.  Bid Boland is the site of a major refinery and natural gas distribution centre.

References 

Populated places in Behbahan County